A guest house is a kind of lodging. 

Guest house may also refer to:

Guest House, a non-profit Catholic-based treatment center for priests and male and female religious
Guest House (TV series), a Pakistani television series
Guest House (1959 film), a 1959 Hindi film
Guest House (1980 film), a 1980 Bollywood horror film directed by Shyam Ramsay and Tulsi Ramsay
Guest House (2020 film), an American comedy
The Guest House, a 2012 lesbian romance film
Alexander Inn, Oak Ridge, Tennessee; known as "The Guest House" during the Manhattan Project
Guest house, a term for an al-Qaeda safe house

See also
House guest (disambiguation)